The 1955 Nations motorcycle Grand Prix was the eighth and final round of the 1955 Grand Prix motorcycle racing season. It took place on 4 September 1955 at the Autodromo Nazionale Monza.

500 cc classification

350 cc classification

250 cc classification

125 cc classification

Sidecar classification

References

Italian motorcycle Grand Prix
Nations Grand Prix
Nations Grand Prix